The Roberto Clemente Award is given annually to the Major League Baseball (MLB) player who "best exemplifies the game of baseball, sportsmanship, community involvement and the individual's contribution to his team", as voted on by baseball fans and members of the media. It is named for Hall of Fame outfielder Roberto Clemente. Originally known as the Commissioner's Award, it has been presented by the MLB since 1971. In 1973, the award was renamed after Clemente following his death in a plane crash while he was delivering supplies to victims of the Nicaragua earthquake.

Each year, a panel of baseball dignitaries selects one player from among 30 nominees, one from each club. Teams choose their nominee during the regular season, and the winner is announced at the World Series. The player who receives the most votes online via MLB's official website, MLB.com, gets one vote in addition to the votes cast by the panel. Since 2007, the Roberto Clemente Award has been presented by Chevy. Chevy donates money and a Chevy vehicle to the recipient's charity of choice and additional money is donated by Chevy to the Roberto Clemente Sports City, a non-profit organization in Carolina, Puerto Rico, that provides recreational sports activities for children. Chevy donates additional funds to the charity of choice of each of the 30 club nominees.

The first recipient of the award was Willie Mays, and the most recent honoree is Justin Turner. No player has received the award more than once. The first pitcher to receive the award was Phil Niekro in 1980, and the first catcher to receive it was Gary Carter in 1989. The team to have the most winners representing their club is the St. Louis Cardinals. To date, Clemente's former teammate Willie Stargell and Andrew McCutchen are the only members of the Pittsburgh Pirates to receive the honor. Stargell won his award in 1974, and McCutchen in 2015. The Pirates themselves have worn Clemente-era throwback uniforms in recent years on Roberto Clemente Day, on which day they present their award nominee to MLB. In 2014, the award was presented to two players—Paul Konerko and Jimmy Rollins—for the first, and to date, only time.

Honorees 

Key

Recipients by year

See also 

Marvin Miller Man of the Year Award
Lou Gehrig Memorial Award
Branch Rickey Award
Bart Giamatti Award
Baseball awards
Golden Spirit Award (similar Japanese awards)

References 
General

 
 
 
 

Specific

External links 

Major League Baseball trophies and awards
Awards established in 1971
Sportsmanship trophies and awards
Roberto Clemente